David Noonan (8 January 1876 – 10 March 1929) was an Australian cricketer. He played five first-class matches for New South Wales in 1895/96.

See also
 List of New South Wales representative cricketers

References

External links
 

1876 births
1929 deaths
Australian cricketers
New South Wales cricketers
Cricketers from Sydney